Elizabeth Freeman (born November 2, 1992) is an American voice actress from Oklahoma City. She is known for providing the English voices of Sempai in Magical Sempai, Trish Una in JoJo's Bizarre Adventure: Golden Wind, Chizuru Mizuhara in Rent-A-Girlfriend, and Chisato Nishikigi in Lycoris Recoil.

Biography 
Freeman started attending plays in her middle school years. During her senior year of high school, she became interested in voice-acting. She did voice impressions and was involved in indie works until transferring in Los Angeles, landing her first role there with the remaster of Secret of Mana.

Filmography

Anime
2019
Sword Art Online: Alicization as Cardinal
The Promised Neverland as Mujika
Lupin the 3rd: Goodbye Partner as Emilka
Magical Sempai as Sempai
Isekai Cheat Magician as Rin Azuma

2020
 JoJo's Bizarre Adventure: Golden Wind as Trish Una
In/Spectre as Kotoko Iwanaga
Magia Record: Puella Magi Madoka Magica Side Story as Felicia Mitsuki
Ascendance of a Bookworm as Delia
Rent-A-Girlfriend as Chizuru Mizuhara
Monster Girl Doctor as Kunai Zenow, Dione Nephilim
The Misfit of Demon King Academy as Ellen Mihais
Tonikawa: Over the Moon for You as Chitose Kaginoji

2021
Adachi and Shimamura as Pancho
The Hidden Dungeon Only I Can Enter as Emma Brightness
Vivy: Fluorite Eye's Song as Momoka Kirishima
Tokyo Revengers as Hinata Tachibana
I've Been Killing Slimes for 300 Years and Maxed Out My Level as Falfa
The Seven Deadly Sins: Dragon's Judgement as Orlondi
Edens Zero as Labilia Christy, Mithra
The Honor Student at Magic High School as Airi Isshiki
Dropout Idol Fruit Tart as Tone Honmachi

2022
The Strongest Sage With the Weakest Crest as Alma
Cells at Work! Code Black as White Blood Cell (Neutrophil) (8787)
Blue Reflection Ray as Yuzu
Lupin the 3rd Part 6 as Finn Clark
Love Live! Superstar!! as Sumire
Lycoris Recoil as Chisato Nishikigi
Fate/Grand Carnival as Ritsuka Fujimaru
PuraOre! Pride of Orange as Ayaka Mizusawa
Pokémon Ultimate Journeys: The Series as Lisia

Web animation
2021
Sunset Paradise as Meggy Spletzer
2022
Pokémon: Hisuian Snow as Alec
2023
The Amazing Digital Circus as Pomni

Video games
2012
Dust: An Elysian Tail as Bopo

2018
Dragalia Lost as Lily

2019
My Time at Portia as Toby
Chocobo's Mystery Dungeon Every Buddy! as Croma Magnolie
Pokémon Masters EX as Sabrina

2021
Cris Tales as Zas
Genshin Impact as Yanfei
Kraken Academy!! as Broccoli Girl, Ana

2022
Chocobo GP as Camilla
Azure Striker Gunvolt 3 as Grazie

References

External links

1992 births
American video game actresses
American voice actresses
Actresses from Oklahoma City
Living people